Arthur Lewis (22 April 1882 – 11 April 1975) was an Australian politician. Born in Melbourne, he received no formal education and was raised in an orphanage. He became a farm labourer and was secretary of the Victorian branch of the Carters and Drivers Union.

In 1929, he was elected to the Australian House of Representatives as the Labor member for Corio. He publicly supported the prohibition of alcohol, stating that he "regretted that it was not possible for the whole Labor Party to support prohibition". He was defeated in 1931.

After leaving federal politics, Lewis worked as a clerk with the Queensland Prohibition League. He made unsuccessful attempts at Labor preselection for the 1934 federal election, 1937 Victorian state election and 1940 federal election. Lewis died in 1975.

References

Australian Labor Party members of the Parliament of Australia
Members of the Australian House of Representatives for Corio
Members of the Australian House of Representatives
1882 births
1975 deaths
Politicians from Melbourne
20th-century Australian politicians